Elections were held on November 2, 2010 to determine Utah's three members of the United States House of Representatives. Representatives were elected for two-year terms to serve in the 112th United States Congress from January 3, 2011 until January 3, 2013. Primary elections were held on June 22, 2010.

All three of Utah's U.S. Representatives (Republicans Rob Bishop of the 1st district and Jason Chaffetz of the 3rd district, and Democrat Jim Matheson of the 2nd district) were re-elected. Of the three elections, only the 2nd district was rated as competitive by The Cook Political Report.

A total of 640,495 votes were cast, of which 390,969 (61.04 percent) were for Republican candidates, 218,236 (34.07 percent) were for Democratic candidates, 18,317 (2.86 percent) were for Constitution Party candidates, 7,252 (1.13 percent) were for Libertarian Party candidates and 5,721 (0.89 percent) were for independent candidates.

Overview
Results of the 2010 United States House of Representatives elections in Utah by district:

District 1

 
The 1st district included Bountiful, Clearfield, Layton, Logan, Ogden, Roy, Tooele and part of Salt Lake City. The district's population was 81 percent white and 13 percent Hispanic (see Race and ethnicity in the United States Census); 90 percent were high school graduates and 28 percent had received a bachelor's degree or higher. Its median income was $55,788. In the 2008 presidential election the district gave 64 percent of its vote to Republican nominee John McCain and 33 percent to Democratic nominee Barack Obama.

Republican Rob Bishop, who took office in 2003, was the incumbent. Bishop was re-elected in 2008 with 65 percent of the vote. In 2010 Bishop's opponent in the general election was Democratic nominee Morgan Bowen, an LDS seminary teacher at Sky View High School. Constitution Party nominee Kirk Pearson and Libertarian Party nominee Jared Paul Stratton also ran. Bishop and Bowen were unopposed in their respective party primaries.

Bishop raised $278,327 and spent $302,771. Bowen raised $11,550 and spent $11,309. A poll of 400 likely voters, conducted by Mason-Dixon Polling & Research Inc. between October 25 and 27, 2010, 65 percent of respondents supported Bishop while 13 percent favored Bowen. In a poll of 375 active voters, conducted by Dan Jones & Associates between October 25 and 28, 2010, Bishop led with 66 percent to Bowen's 21 percent, while 4 percent supported Pearson, Stratton had the support of 1 percent, 1 percent favored other candidates and 7 percent were undecided.

Prior to the election ''FiveThirtyEights forecast gave Bishop a 100 percent chance of winning and projected that he would receive 73 percent of the vote to Bowen's 24 percent. On election day Bishop was re-elected with 69 percent of the vote to Bowen's 24 percent. Bishop was again re-elected in 2012 and 2014.

General election results

External links
 
 
 

District 2

The 2nd district included Millcreek, Sandy, St. George and parts of Lehi, Murray and Salt Lake City. The district's population was 86 percent white and 8 percent Hispanic (see Race and ethnicity in the United States Census); 92 percent were high school graduates and 33 percent had received a bachelor's degree or higher. Its median income was $55,863. In the 2008 presidential election the district gave 58 percent of its vote to Republican nominee John McCain and 40 percent to Democratic nominee Barack Obama. In 2010 the district had a Cook Partisan Voting Index of R+15.

Democrat Jim Matheson, who took office in 2001, was the incumbent. Matheson was re-elected in 2008 with 63 percent of the vote. In July 2009 Matheson said he would seek re-election rather than running for governor or for the U.S. Senate. In 2010 Matheson's opponent in the general election was Republican nominee Morgan Philpot, a former member of the Utah House of Representatives. Independent candidates Dave Glissmeyer, the founder of ProTel NetWorks; and Wayne L. Hill; and Constitution Party nominee Randall Hinton, a web developer, also ran. Claudia Wright, a teacher, also sought the Democratic nomination. Scott McCoy, a member of the Utah State Senate, suggested in November 2009 that Matheson should be challenged in the Democratic primary in response to his vote against the Patient Protection and Affordable Care Act, but said he would not run. Philpot was unopposed in the Republican primary.

Matheson raised $1,803,801 and spent $2,465,527. Philpot raised $386,467 and spent the same amount. Glissmeyer raised $8,987 and spent $11,150.

In a poll of 200 registered voters, conducted by Western Wats between September 30 and October 3, 2010, Matheson led with 46 percent to Philpot's 30 percent. A poll of 226 likely voters, conducted by Dan Jones & Associates, the results of which were published in October 2010, found Matheson leading with 57 percent to Philpot's 31 percent, while Glissmeyer and Hinton had the support of 1 percent apiece, less than 1 percent backed Hill, and 9 percent were undecided. In a poll of 400 likely voters, conducted by Mason-Dixon Polling & Research Inc. between October 25 and 27, 2010, 48 percent of respondents supported Matheson while 35 percent favored Philpot and 11 percent were undecided. A poll of 456 active voters, conducted by Dan Jones & Associates between October 25 and 28, 2010, found Matheson leading with 51 percent to Philpot's 39 percent, while 1 percent supported Hinton, 1 percent backed other candidates, and 7 percent were undecided.

In October 2010 The Cook Political Report rated the race as "Likely Democratic". Prior to the election FiveThirtyEight'''s forecast gave Matheson an 87 percent chance of winning and projected that he would receive 53 percent of the vote to Philpot's 44 percent. On election day Matheson was re-elected with 50 percent of the vote to Philpot's 46 percent. Matheson was again re-elected in 2012 and retired rather than seeking re-election in 2014. He was succeeded by Republican Mia Love.

Democratic primary results

 
 
 
 

General election results

External links
 
 
 
 
 

District 3

 
The 3rd district included Orem, Provo, South Jordan, Taylorsville, West Jordan and West Valley City. The district's population was 80 percent white and 14 percent Hispanic (see Race and ethnicity in the United States Census); 89 percent were high school graduates and 26 percent had received a bachelor's degree or higher. Its median income was $57,852. In the 2008 presidential election the district gave 67 percent of its vote to Republican nominee John McCain and 29 percent to Democratic nominee Barack Obama.

Republican Jason Chaffetz, who took office in 2009, was the incumbent. Chaffetz was elected in 2008 with 66 percent of the vote. Chaffetz announced in January 2010 that he would seek re-election rather than running for the U.S. Senate. In 2010 Chaffetz's opponent in the general election was Democratic nominee Karen Hyer, an adjunct professor at Brigham Young University. Independent candidate Joe Puente, a filmmaker and actor; Libertarian Party nominee Jake Shannon, a hypnotherapist and entrepreneur; and Constitution Party nominee Douglas Sligting also ran.

Chaffetz raised $647,194 and spent $540,646. Hyer raised $23,818 and spent the same amount. Sligtig raised $3,536 and spent $2,225.

In a poll of 400 likely voters, conducted by Mason-Dixon Polling & Research Inc. between October 25 and 27, 2010, Chaffetz led with 56 percent to Hyer's 11 percent. A poll of 375 active voters, conducted by Dan Jones & Associates between October 25 and 28, 2010, found Chaffetz leading with 70 percent to Hyer's 19 percent, while Sligting had the support of 2 percent, Puente had the support of 1 percent, 2 percent chose other candidates and 6 percent were undecided. Prior to the election FiveThirtyEights forecast gave Chaffetz a 100 percent chance of winning and projected that he would receive 73 percent of the vote to Hyer's 23 percent. On election day Chaffetz was re-elected with 72 percent of the vote to Hyer's 23 percent. Chaffetz was again re-elected in 2012 and 2014.

General election results

External links
 
 
 
Joe Puente campaign announcement at the blog Puente's Perspective (February 1, 2011)

See also
 List of United States representatives from Utah
 United States congressional delegations from Utah

References

2010 Utah elections
Utah
2010